Sidi M'Hamed is a district in Algiers Province, Algeria. It was named after its capital, Sidi M'Hamed.

Municipalities
The district is further divided into four municipalities:
Sidi M'Hamed
El Madania 
El Mouradia 
Alger Centre

Notable people
 Sidi M'hamed Bou Qobrine, Algerian berber theologian
 Lyès Deriche, 20th-century leader of the Algerian national political movement against the French.
 Ahmed Mahsas, 20th-century leader of the Algerian national political movement against the French.

References

Districts of Algiers Province